"Get Your Hands off My Woman" is the debut single by the English rock band the Darkness. The song was released in February 2003 as the lead single from the group's debut studio album, Permission to Land. Although the single went on to win a Metal Hammer "Golden God" award for best single, it has become the band's lowest charting single worldwide. Credited to all four members of the group, the song supposedly reflected personal experiences of lead vocalist Justin Hawkins. "Get Your Hands off My Woman" became a sing-along favourite at concerts by the Darkness, in part due to its parodic obscenity. The song was covered by Ben Folds on his 2004 EP Super D.

Track listing
 CD single
 "Get Your Hands Off My Woman" – 3:18
 "The Best of Me" – 3:30
 "Get Your Hands Off My Woman" (Clean Radio Version) – 3:07

 7" Vinyl
 "Get Your Hands Off My Woman" – 3:18
 "The Best of Me" – 3:30

Chart performance

External links
News story on the Darkness, including discussion of "Get Your Hands off My Woman"
Review of concert by the Darkness, including "Get Your Hands off My Woman"  from New Times Broward-Palm Beach

References

2003 debut singles
The Darkness (band) songs
2003 songs
Songs written by Justin Hawkins
Songs written by Dan Hawkins (musician)
Songs written by Ed Graham
Songs written by Frankie Poullain
Atlantic Records singles